Habitus: A Diaspora Journal is a semiannual magazine of international literature and culture.

The  magazine's mission statement begins: "Habitus is a Jewish magazine that takes the whole world seriously. Our starting point is international Jewry; but this is only the beginning of a far-reaching inquiry that seeks to capture a profoundly modern viewpoint that is both expansive and inclusive.

Habitus takes its shape from the elusive concept known as the Diaspora – that untidy mix of longing and belonging, past and place. It represents an experience that is both personal and universal. The Diaspora condition confounds and consumes, even as it touches more and more lives around the globe. This thematic thread will speak to contemporary readers – of all backgrounds – who feel the pull of complex identities and biographies, and who wrestle with what it means to be truly at home."

According to a feature in The Forward by staff writer Nathan Popper, Habitus' "operating premise is that the relation of Jews to their far-flung homes — in places like Buenos Aires and Sarajevo and New Orleans — has a great deal to tell us not only about Jewish life but also about the modern experience with all its dislocation and movement."

Each issue of the magazine is dedicated to writing about a different city, and features Jewish writers alongside leading non-Jewish voices. The journal's debut issue in the fall of 2006 was dedicated to Budapest. The second issue, released in June 2007, is dedicated to Sarajevo. Future issues will include Buenos Aires, New Orleans, and other cities.

Some of the journal's contributors include George Konrad, Aleksandar Hemon, Semezdin Mehmedinović, David Rieff, Ágnes Heller, Peter Zilahy, Courtney Angela Brkic, and George Szirtes.

External links
 Habitus website 
 The Forward feature on Habitus

Literary magazines published in the United States
Jewish culture
Magazines established in 2006
Magazines published in New York City